Federico Nacci (born 5 April 1998) is an Italian professional footballer who plays as a midfielder.

Career
Born in Collegno, Nacci started his career in Juventus, Torino and Alessandria youth sector. As a senior, he joined to Serie D club Chieri for the 2015–16 season.

Nacci made his senior debut in the 2016–17 Serie D season with Pro Eureka.

On 5 July 2017, he moved to Serie D club Pisa. At the middle of the season, in January 2018, he joined to Serie C club Paganese on loan. Nacci made his professional debut on 4 February against Juve Stabia. His loan was extended the next year.

On 13 August 2019, he was loaned to Lecco.

On 13 February 2021, he joined to Serie D club Portici 1906.

The next season, on 9 August 2021, he returned to Serie C and signed with Campobasso.

References

External links
 
 

1998 births
Living people
People from Collegno
Footballers from Piedmont
Italian footballers
Association football midfielders
Serie C players
Serie D players
Juventus F.C. players
Torino F.C. players
U.S. Alessandria Calcio 1912 players
A.S.D. Calcio Chieri 1955 players
Pisa S.C. players
Paganese Calcio 1926 players
Calcio Lecco 1912 players
A.S. Bisceglie Calcio 1913 players
S.S.D. Città di Campobasso players
Sportspeople from the Metropolitan City of Turin